Clathrotropis is a genus of flowering plants in the family Fabaceae. It belongs to the subfamily Faboideae.

Species
Clathrotropis comprises the following species:
 Clathrotropis brachypetala (Tul.) Kleinhoonte
 Clathrotropis brunnea Amshoff

 Clathrotropis glaucophylla R.S. Cowan

 Clathrotropis macrocarpa Ducke
 Clathrotropis nitida (Benth.) Harms
 Clathrotropis paradoxa Sandwith

Species names with uncertain taxonomic status
The status of the following species is unresolved:
 Clathrotropis rosea M.Yu.Gontsch. & Povydysh

References

Ormosieae
Fabaceae genera